1 Hopeful Rd. is the third studio album by Vintage Trouble, released on August 14, 2015 by Blue Note Records.

Reception

1 Hopeful Rd. received mixed reviews from critics. On Metacritic, the album holds a score of 61/100 based on 4 reviews, indicating "generally favorable reviews."

Track listing

Charts

References

2015 albums
Blue Note Records albums
Capitol Records albums
Vintage Trouble albums
Albums recorded at EastWest Studios